18419 / 20 Puri–Jaynagar Express is an Express train belonging to Indian Railways East Coast Railway zone that runs between  and  in India.

Service 
It operates as train number 18419 from Puri to Jaynagar and as train number 18420 in the reverse direction, serving the states of Odisha, West Bengal, Jharkhand and Bihar.

Schedule

Coaches
The 18419 / 20 Puri–Jaynagar  Express has one AC 2-tier, three AC 3-tier, nine sleeper class, seven general unreserved & two SLR (seating with luggage rake) coaches. It doesn't carries a pantry car.

As with most train services in India, coach composition may be amended at the discretion of Indian Railways depending on demand.

RSA – Rake sharing
22827/22828 – Puri–Surat Express

Reversals
ASN –

Routing

Traction

References

External links
18419 Puri Jaynagar Express at India Rail Info
18420 Jaynagar Puri Express at India Rail Info

Express trains in India
Rail transport in Bihar
Rail transport in Jharkhand
Rail transport in West Bengal
Rail transport in Odisha
Transport in Puri
Transport in Jainagar